Diclofenac etalhyaluronate (INN, USAN; trade name Joycle) is an anti-inflammatory and joint function improving drug.  In Japan it is approved for use in the treatment of knee osteoarthritis.

Chemically, diclofenac etalhyaluronate consists of the drug diclofenac, a nonsteroidal antiinflammatory drug, covalently linked to hyaluronic acid.  In the body, diclofenac is slowly cleaved and released, allowing diclofenac etalhyaluronate to function as a sustained-release form of diclofenac.

References

Nonsteroidal anti-inflammatory drugs
Chlorobenzenes